Columbia Island may refer to several places:

 Columbia Island (New York), U.S., in Long Island Sound
 Columbia Island (District of Columbia), U.S., in the Potomac River